Wadjet Eye Games is an American indie video game developer, voice casting/directing contractor/subcontractor and publisher which specialises in point-and-click adventure games. It was founded in 2006 by Dave Gilbert as a means to publish his own games, but has since expanded to publishing games by other designers as well.

History
Gilbert produced The Shivah in 2006 for MAGS, the monthly one-month Adventure Game Studio game contest. After winning the contest, Gilbert continued to improve The Shivah, adding voice acting and extra puzzles, then released it as a commercial title. It was originally sold via Manifesto Games, until Gilbert formed Wadjet Eye Games in order to sell it himself and move into game design full-time.

In 2006, Wadjet Eye released The Blackwell Legacy, the first in the Blackwell series. This was followed in 2007 by the continuation of the series, Blackwell Unbound. In February 2008, a publishing deal was announced between Wadjet Eye Games and PlayFirst. Under the agreement, Wadjet Eye Games would develop a casual adventure game for PlayFirst. The resulting game, Emerald City Confidential, a noir story set in L. Frank Baum's Land of Oz, was released on 19 February 2009. That year also saw the release of the third Blackwell game, The Blackwell Convergence.

In 2010, Wadjet Eye Games published the first game developed by somebody other than Gilbert; this was Puzzle Bots, a casual puzzle game developed by Ivy Games. Further third-party games published by Wadjet Eye Games through 2011 and 2012 were Gemini Rue, Da New Guys, Resonance and Primordia. In February 2013 it was announced that Wadjet Eye Games would be publishing their first portable release, with Gemini Rue being ported to both iPhone and iPad.

At one point Wadjet Eye was planning a game based on comic books by Vertigo.

Awards
Wadjet Eye Games was nominated for the Best New Studio award at the  Game Developers Choice Awards in 2007, the same year that  Gilbert received the AGS Lifetime Achievement Award In 2008, Gamasutra listed Wadjet Eye among their top 20 breakthrough developers.

Games

References

External links
 

American companies established in 2006
Video game companies established in 2006
Privately held companies based in New York City
Video game companies of the United States
Video game development companies
Video game publishers